Shelburn is an unincorporated community and  ghost town located in Linn County, Oregon, United States, established in the 1850s. The town experienced a significant number of deaths in the 1860s during the third cholera pandemic along the Oregon Trail. A blacksmith shop in the city dates to the 1890s.

References

Ghost towns in Oregon
Unincorporated communities in Linn County, Oregon